Lubiatów  is a village in the administrative district of Gmina Otmuchów, within Nysa County, Opole Voivodeship, in south-western Poland, close to the Czech border.

The village has a population of 280.

References

Villages in Nysa County